Transmembrane protein 215 is a protein that in humans is encoded by the TMEM215 gene.

References

Further reading 

Human proteins